TTG Studios was a recording studio in Los Angeles, California, co-founded in 1965 by recording engineers Tom Hidley and Amnon "Ami" Hadani.

History
The studio was located at 1441 North McCadden Place in the Hollywood section of Los Angeles, near the intersection of Sunset Boulevard and Highland Avenue. Originally the home of the Hollywood Knights of Columbus, the building was built in 1927, an active period in Hollywood, as nearby buildings Grauman's Chinese Theatre, the Hollywood Roosevelt Hotel and the Hollywood Athletic Club all date from the same period. In 1960, Radio Recorders converted the ground floor billiards room and half the lounge into a recording studio to form their Sunset-Highland Division, which housed the Blue Network and other entertainment-related companies.

TTG was co-founded by Tom Hidley and Amnon "Ami" Hadani, who had both previously worked with MGM/Verve Records and A & R Recording in New York before relocating to Los Angeles in 1965 to found TTG. The studio's name did not stand for "Two Terrible Guys" as has been mistakenly claimed, but rather was adopted from the name of a Jewish Brigade formed after World War II whose name was an acronym for the Israeli slang expression "Tilhas Tizig Gesheften", which roughly translates to "up your ass".

TTG leased 1441 North McCadden Place, converting the second story main hall into a large recording studio that could accommodate up to 100 musicians. Meticulously and innovatively designed by Hidley with a high decibel level threshold, the studio became popular with the up-and-coming rock musicians of that time, including The Monkees, Eric Burdon, Frank Zappa and The Mothers of Invention, and Alice Cooper. Burdon introduced Jimi Hendrix to the studio and Hendrix "raved" about the studio's sound.

TTG installed one of the first 16-track tape recorders, which was custom built by co-owner Hidley, at a time when 4- or 8-track recording was still the norm. Jimi Hendrix used this machine at TTG in October 1968. 

TTG went out of business in 1985, and building was sold to Yoram and Peggy Kahana, owners and directors of Shooting Star International, a photo agency. The agency retrofitted the cinder block structure, restored the main hall and third floor balcony to their original state, and moved into the building in December 1990. The Kahanas kept and upgraded the ground floor recording studio, which is now occupied by their tenants Wax Ltd, the multi-platinum production and songwriting record label of Wally Gagel and Xandy Barry, and WICK Studios, a photo and video rental production studio.

Personnel

Tom Hidley

TTG Studios' co-founder was Tom Hidley. He was born May 27, 1931 in Los Angeles, California. As a teen, he spent long hours playing the saxophone, clarinet, and flute, until ordered to cease by his physician after a physical breakdown. He then turned to non-performance aspects of music, and spent nights recording at clubs and days working at loudspeaker and tape-machine companies.

In 1959, "Madman Muntz" hired Hidley to assist in the development of the first car stereo. Among the first to own a Muntz car stereo was Frank Sinatra, the famous singer and actor.  Through Sinatra's purchase, Hidley became known to a Sinatra associate Val Valentin, who invited Hildley to assist in the building of a new recording studio in New York. In 1962, they built the MGM/Verve studio.  In 1964, Phil Ramone hired Hidley to work at his A&R studio as the audio technical manager.  Also employed at that time by A&R was Ami Hadani. Hidley went on to found Westlake Recording Studios in the 1970s, a facility which was highly influential in standardizing acoustic design in the recording industry and which has been used by a large number of prominent vocal artists.

Ami Hadani
TTG co-founder Amnon "Ami" Hadani was born August 19, 1929. He was credited as Omi Hadan on some records. Hadani's association with MGM/Verve artists preceded TTG and his work with rock groups. He engineered albums by jazzmen Ray Brown and Milt Jackson, actress Lainie Kazan, and location recording for standup comic Shelley Berman.

According to Bruce Botnick, Hadani was a General in the Israeli Air Force, and had to leave for weeks at a time when Israel was at war.

Ami Hadani was married to actress/screenwriter Ellen Weston and they had one child, Jonathan Hadani. They were divorced when their son was six years old. Ami remarried Christine Ermacoff, a studio cellist. Ami Hadani died on September 22, 2014 in Los Angeles.

Albums recorded at TTG Studios

References

External links
 WICK Studios website
 WAX LTD website

Recording studios in California
Buildings and structures in Los Angeles
1965 establishments in California
1985 disestablishments in California